is a Japanese manga series written and illustrated by Saka Mikami. It began serialization on Kodansha's Magazine Pocket manga website and app in October 2021.

Publication
Written and illustrated by Saka Mikami, Kaoru Hana wa Rin to Saku began serialization on Kodansha's Magazine Pocket website and app on October 20, 2021. The series has been collected in seven volumes as of March 2023.

Reception
The series was nominated for the 2022 Next Manga Awards in the web category and was ranked sixth out of fifty nominees. The series was also nominated for the Tsutaya Comic Awards and ranked second. The series ranked seventh in the Nationwide Bookstore Employees' Recommended Comics of 2023.

The series has over 1 million copies in circulation as of March 2023.

References

External links
 

2021 manga
Japanese webcomics
Kodansha manga
Romantic comedy anime and manga
Shōnen manga
Webcomics in print